Messanges is the name of the following communes in France:

 Messanges, Côte-d'Or, in the Côte-d'Or department
 Messanges, Landes, in the Landes department